The Philipsburg-Osceola Area School District is a public school district serving the portions of Centre County, Pennsylvania and Clearfield County, Pennsylvania. It encompasses the Centre County municipalities of Phillipsburg Boro and Rush Township, as well as the Clearfield County municipalities of Wallaceton Boro, Chester Hill Boro, Osceola Mills Boro, and the townships of Decatur, and Boggs.

Schools
In the district, there are two elementary schools (grades K–4), a middle school (grades 5–8), and a senior high school (grades 9–12).

Elementary schools

 Osceola Mills, originally constructed in 1919 and has had several additions and renovations, the last being in 1995.  The school is located at 400 Coal Street in Osceola Mills Boro..
 Phillipsburg is located at 1810 Black Moshannon Road in Rush Township, and was constructed in 2005 and is

Junior high school
The Philipsburg-Osceola Area Junior High, originally serving as North Lincoln Hill, was constructed in 1963 and was last renovated and modified in 2012-2014. The junior high is located at 200 Short Street in Phillipsburg Boro.

Senior high school
The Philipsburg-Osceola Area High School was built in 1959 and was last renovated and modified in 1999 when the 9th grade was moved to the building. The school is located at 502 Philips Street in Philipsburg Boro.

Other facilities
 Wallaceton-Boggs School - Built in 1956, 1973 addition, closed because of declining enrollment.
 Philipsburg-Osceola Junior High- Closed due to building problems

Athletics

 Baseball - Class AA
 Basketball - Class AA
 Bowling - Class AAAA
 Cross Country - Class AA
 Football - Class AA
 Golf - Class AAAA
 Soccer - Class AA
 Softball - Class AA
 Track and Field - Class AA
 Volleyball - Class AA

References

External links

 Penna. Inter-Scholastic Athletic Assn.

Philipsburg Osceola Student. It...

School districts in Centre County, Pennsylvania
School districts in Clearfield County, Pennsylvania